Rietvallei may refer to:

 Rietvallei, Gauteng
 Rietvallei, KwaZulu-Natal
 Rietvallei Wine Estate